William Sproston Caine (26 March 1842 – 17 March 1903) was a British politician and temperance advocate.

Biography
Caine was born at Seacombe, Cheshire, and was the eldest surviving son of Nathaniel Caine, a metal merchant from Cheshire, and was educated at private schools in Egremont, Merseyside and Birkenhead before entering his father's business in 1861. In 1864 he was made a partner, before moving to Liverpool in 1871. In 1873 he was recorded at 16 Alexandra Drive, Liverpool. Public Affairs soon began to occupy large amounts of his attention, and he left the firm in 1878.

After his retirement from his father's company, he retained the directorship of the Hodbarrow Mining Co. Ltd, Millom, and he secured the controlling interest in the Shaw's Brown Iron Co., Liverpool, leaving the management of the concern in the hands of his partner, Arthur S. Cox. The business collapsed in 1893, leaving large amounts of debt which were honourably discharged, but Caine's resources were afterwards largely devoted to paying off the mortgage which he raised to meet the firm's losses.

Caine was brought up as a Baptist under the ministry of Hugh Stowell Brown, whose daughter Alice married Caine in 1868; they had two sons (including the author William Caine) and three daughters. Caine would tell the story of how he sat down to drink sherry whilst reading a temperance book by Julia Wightman. He was so convinced that he never drank again.

He joined the Liverpool Temperance and Band of Hope Union, also becoming chairman of the Popular Control and Licensing Reform Association. In 1873 he was elected vice-president of the United Kingdom Alliance. He was also president of the Baptist Total Abstinence Society, the Congregational Temperance Society, the British Temperance League, and the National Temperance Federation.

Caine first became interested in running for parliament in 1873 to advance his temperance views, and unsuccessfully contested Liverpool in 1873 and 1874 for the Liberal Party. In 1880 he was returned for Scarborough and, identifying with the extreme radical side, began promoting his views on temperance at the House of Commons. In 1884 he was made Civil Lord of the Admiralty in succession to Thomas Brassey, retaining his seat in parliament through the necessary by-election but losing in the 1885 general election.

In 1886, he was returned for Barrow-in-Furness after a by-election, and played an active part in organising the Liberal Unionist Party, which was nicknamed the "Brand of Caine" as a result. Caine was appointed Chief Whip for the Liberal Unionists, but his extreme temperance views soon damaged the Unionist alliance with the Conservative Party. After the passing of a scheme compensating holders of extinguished public-house licences, Caine resigned as Whip and his position in the House in protest. He ran for reelection at the by-election as an Independent Liberal, but was defeated.

In 1892, he was again elected for Bradford East but lost his seat at the 1895 election. His daughter Hannah married John Roberts, 1st Baron Clwyd in 1893. Another daughter Ruth married Liberal MP Herbert Lewis in 1897. Caine reentered the House in 1900 for Camborne. Parliamentary activities exhausted his health, and after a trip to South America in 1902 failed to restore it, he died of heart failure in 1903 in Mayfair aged 60.

Due to his opposition to alcohol he was praised by Gandhi. It has been suggested that Caine was the model for the story "The Enlightenments of Pagett, M.P." by Rudyard Kipling. Kipling notes that "Pagett" was a liberal supporter of A.O. Hume and particularly William Digby to whom Caine dedicated his 1890 guidebook Picturesque India.

References

External links 
 

1842 births
1903 deaths
Liberal Party (UK) MPs for English constituencies
Lords of the Admiralty
UK MPs 1880–1885
UK MPs 1885–1886
UK MPs 1886–1892
UK MPs 1892–1895
UK MPs 1900–1906
Politics of Bradford
Members of the Parliament of the United Kingdom for Camborne
Liberal Unionist Party MPs for English constituencies